Söğütlü is a town and district of Sakarya Province in the Marmara region of Turkey.  Population is estimated around 10,000. The mayor is Ertuğrul Özcan (AKP).

References

Populated places in Sakarya Province
Districts of Sakarya Province